Kalanchoe millotii is a succulent plant that is native south-central and southeastern Madagascar. It forms a shrub up to a foot high. The leaf is a hazy green and scalloped, with dense felt covering it.

This succulent, like most of its kind, requires porous soil and can only tolerate light frost. The plant is hardy to 36–40 degrees and needs bright light, or full sun to partial shade. This succulent only requires regular waterings during the summer or during heat waves, otherwise watering weekly is sufficient.

References

millottii
Endemic flora of Madagascar
Taxa named by Joseph Marie Henry Alfred Perrier de la Bâthie